Similipepsis typica is a moth of the family Sesiidae. It is known from Cameroon, Equatorial Guinea, Sierra Leone and Zimbabwe.

References

Sesiidae
Moths of Africa
Moths described in 1913
Taxa named by Embrik Strand